The Hizey Covered Bridge, in Fairfield County, Ohio, is a Burr Truss covered bridge which was built in 1891 by James W. Buchanan.  It was listed on the National Register of Historic Places in 1976 when it was still located at its original location.  

It was moved in 1979 to a private drive a few miles away.  It is now located on a private drive at 12549 Tollgate Rd., crossing Sycamore Creek (at ).

It is in Violet Township.

References

External links
Hizey Covered Bridge, at Bridgehunter, with photos at both locations

Covered bridges in Ohio
National Register of Historic Places in Fairfield County, Ohio
Transport infrastructure completed in 1891